Luster is a village in Luster Municipality in Vestland county, Norway. The village is located on the western shore of the Lustrafjorden, at the mouth of the river Dalsdalselvi. Norwegian County Road 55 runs through the village, which is about half-way between the villages of Skjolden and Nes. Dale Church was built in the village of Luster in 1240 and it is still in use.

Name 
The name originally belonged to the fjord (now Lustrafjorden). The name is derived from the word ljóss which means "light" or "bright" - referring to the bright color of the water from the glaciers. Prior to 1918, the name was written Lyster.

References 

Villages in Vestland
Luster, Norway